Universidad Independiente was a Honduran soccer club based in San Pedro Sula, Honduras.

History
The club has played in the Honduran second division. In summer 2010, they sold their place in the league to Parrillas One with around 12 Universidad players joining the new team.

References

Defunct football clubs in Honduras
Association football clubs disestablished in 2010